This is a list of mountains and hills in County Mayo, Ireland.

 Achill Sound Hill
 Barrclashcame
 Beg Range
 Ben Creggan
 Ben Gorm
 Birreencorragh
 Bohaun
 Bullaunmore
 Carrafull
 Carrawteige
 Claggan Mountain
 Clare Island Hills
 Clew Bay drumlins
 Cloghmoyle
 Corraun Hill
 Corslieve
 Croagh Patrick
 Croaghaun
 Croaghmoyle
 Devilsmother
 Finny
 Fox Hill
 Glenamong
 Glencastle Hill
 Glinsk Mountain
 Inishturk Island Hill
 Killogeary
 Knappagh
 Knockadaf
 Knockaffertagh
 Knocklettercuss
 Knockmore
 Knocknalower
 Knocknascollop
 Maumakeogh Mountain
 Maumykelly
 Maumtrasna
 Mweelin
 Mweelrea
 Nephin
 Nephin Beg
 Ox Mountains (west section)
 Partry Mountains
 Pollatomish
 Porturlin
 Rathlackan
 Sheeffry Hills
 Slieve Carr
 Slieve Fyagh
 Slieve Gamph
 Slievemore
 Sraheens
 Stonefield
 Tawnaghmore
 Termon Hill
 Tower Hill
 Tristia

See also
 List of mountains in Ireland

References

Mayo
Mountains and hills of County Mayo
Mountains